Radul or Radule is a Slavic given name, derived from the word rad, meaning "work, care ". It is the base of the Serbian surnames of Radulović, Radulić, Raduljica, and the Russian and Bulgarian Radulov. Several toponyms are derived from the name, such as Radule in Poland, Radul in Ukraine, Radulovtsi in Bulgaria, etc.

It may refer to:
Radul Milkov (1883–1962), Bulgarian pioneer of aviation
Radul Petrović, brother of Danilo I, Metropolitan of Cetinje
Radul, fresco master who painted the Serbian Orthodox monasteries of Ostrog and Praskvica
Radul the Grammarian
Radule Božović, a Serbian Orthodox priest executed in 1945 for supporting the Chetnik movement
Vladimir Radusinović, nicknamed Radule, singer and guitarist
Nikola Radulović (footballer), nicknamed Radule
Radule, a character in Serbian epic poetry
Vojvoda Radule, an 18th-century Montenegrin warrior
Radule Radulović, Bosnian footballer
Radule Jevrić
Radule Živković
Radul of Riđani

Slavic masculine given names
Serbian masculine given names

Bulgarian masculine given names